Fox was a Greek pay-television channel, that was launched on October 1st, 2012 replacing FX. Its programming consists of comedy, drama, science fiction, action and animation series such as The Simpsons, Criminal Minds, Suits and Legion with new episodes for the first time in Greece. It also broadcasts the biggest hit series in Greece in less than 24 hours after the US such as The Walking Dead, Homeland, American Horror Story and Empire.

Programmes

Current

9-1-1
9-1-1: Lone Star
American Horror Story
Bones
How I Met Your Mother
Mad About You
NCIS: Los Angeles
NCIS: New Orleans
Snowfall
Solar Opposites
Tales of the Walking Dead
The Goldbergs
The Simpsons

Former

11.22.63
24: Live Another Day
24: Legacy
According to Jim
Agents of S.H.I.E.L.D.
American Crime Story
American Dad!
Arrested Development
Atlanta
Awake
Beauty & the Beast
Bob's Burgers
Breakout Kings
Brickleberry
Burn Notice
Chance
Criminal Minds
Crisis
Dads
Da Vinci's Demons
Deep State
Elementary
Empire
Enlisted
Episodes
Falling Skies
False Flag
Family Guy
Feud
Friends
Gang Related
Ghosted
Graceland
Homeland
Jo
Legion
Legit
Lie to Me
Marvel's Agent Carter
Marvel's Inhumans
Outcast
Prison Break
Rules of Engagement
Scream Queens
Sleepy Hollow
Sons of Anarchy
Suits
That '70s Show
The Americans
The Bastard Executioner
The Bridge
The Cleveland Show
The Finder
The Gifted
The Hour
The Killing
The League
The Strain
The Walking Dead
The X-Files
Touch
Trust
Tyrant
Unsupervised
Wayward Pines
White Collar
Wilfred

See also
 Fox Life Greece
 FX Greece
 National Geographic Greece

External links
 FOX Greece official site

References

Television channels and stations established in 2012
2012 establishments in Greece
Television channels and stations disestablished in 2023
2023 disestablishments in Greece
Greek-language television stations
Defunct television channels in Greece
Fox Channel